"Beautiful People" is a song by English singer-songwriter Ed Sheeran featuring American singer Khalid. It was released on 28 June 2019 through Asylum Records as the third single from the former's compilation album, No.6 Collaborations Project (2019). 

It reached number one on the UK Singles Chart in July 2019, becoming the second single from the album to reach the summit of the chart. Sheeran released an acoustic solo version of the song on 15 July without Khalid. The song has reached 1 billion streams on Spotify and 315 million views on YouTube.

Background and promotion
"Beautiful People" was announced as part of the tracklist for No.6 Collaborations Project (2019). Ed Sheeran revealed the song's artwork and release date on 23 June 2019. Footage of it being recorded in a studio was released in the following days leading up to its release.

Composition

"Beautiful People" is composed in  time and the key of E-flat major, with a moderate R&B groove and a tempo of 96 beats per minute. It has a chord progression of Cm–E–A–Gm7. Sheeran and Khalid's vocal range spans two octaves from B3 to B5.

Critical reception
NMEs Nick Levine wrote that Sheeran's "skills as a pop craftsman are on full display" and the song "gives his usual everybro persona a welcome edge." Chris Willman of Variety said Sheeran and Khalid make "a good match". Bernadette Giacomazzo of HipHopDX viewed it as "one of the few tracks that actually works on the album", writing, "though they recycle old tropes, they stick to what they know best, which is just fine." Malvika Padin of Clash found the track "strong and likeable, but nothing surprising." Pitchforks Rawiya Kameir was less impressed, calling it "heavy-handed" and "a catchy calculation appropriate for the sad-pop dominating the charts." Evening Standard reviewer Phoebe Luckhurst described the track as "Chainsmokers-esque". Lucy Shanker of Consequence regarded the song as "disingenuous".

Music video
The music video for "Beautiful People" was teased a day before its 28 June release. It was directed by Andy McLeod, and filmed in Barcelona and at the Lleida-Alguaire Airport in Catalonia, Spain.

The video opens with a simple looking couple waiting in line with their luggage at a small airport. After being approached by a pair of airport personnel, they are directed to a long white limousine waiting outside. The couple hesitantly enters the limousine, where they eat snacks they packed and notice other fancy cars driving past them, apparently heading to the same destination.

As the video continues, the couple find themselves at a series of fancy, expensive places filled with beautiful people: a pool party beside a mansion, a yacht filled with models, a fashion show (which includes cameos of Ed Sheeran and Khalid), and a house party. Surrounded by wealth, indulgence, and beauty, the couple reacts to everything with cautious interest, but spend most of their time focused on each other, following the song's theme of being true to oneself.

At the end of the video, the couple flies home on a private plane, and upon landing at the airport, they are offered a ride in a nice car. The couple decline, take hands, and head for the airport bus instead.

Track listing
Digital download and streaming
"Beautiful People" (featuring Khalid) – 3:17

Digital download and streaming – Danny L Harle Harlecore Remix
"Beautiful People" (featuring Khalid) [Danny L Harle Harlecore Remix] – 3:45

Digital download and streaming – NOTD Remix
"Beautiful People" (featuring Khalid) [NOTD Remix] – 2:42

Digital download and streaming – Acoustic
"Beautiful People" (Acoustic) – 3:06

Digital download and streaming – Jack Wins Remix
"Beautiful People" (featuring Khalid) [Jack Wins Remix] – 2:43

Credits and personnel
Credits adapted from the liner notes of No.6 Collaborations Project

Locations
Recorded at MXM Studios (Stockholm, Sweden), Mandarin Oriental (Hong Kong) and Promised Land Music Studios (London)
Mixed at MixStar Studios (Virginia Beach, Virginia) 
Mastered at Metropolis Mastering (London)

Personnel
Ed Sheeran – vocals, songwriter, producer
Khalid – additional vocals, songwriter
Max Martin – songwriter, producer
Shellback – songwriter, producer, guitar, programming
Fred – background vocals, songwriter, producer, programming, bass, drums, guitar, keys, engineer
Alex Gibson – additional production
Serban Ghenea – mixing
Denis Kosiak – recording Khalid's vocals
Joe Rubel – engineer
John Hanes – engineer
Michael Ilbert – engineer
Stuart Hawkes – masterering

Charts

Weekly charts

Year-end charts

Certifications

Release history

References

External links
 

2019 singles
2019 songs
Ed Sheeran songs
Asylum Records singles
Khalid (singer) songs
Song recordings produced by Ed Sheeran
Song recordings produced by Fred Again
Song recordings produced by Max Martin
Song recordings produced by Shellback (record producer)
Songs written by Ed Sheeran
Songs written by Fred Again
Songs written by Khalid (singer)
Songs written by Max Martin
Songs written by Shellback (record producer)
UK Singles Chart number-one singles
Male vocal duets
Warner Music Group singles